Melaleuca cliffortioides is a plant in the myrtle family, Myrtaceae and is endemic to the south-west of Western Australia. It is a small, prickly shrub very similar to Melaleuca podiocarpa but with fewer stamens in the flowers.

Description
Its branchlets are densely covered with soft, fine hairs.

The plant flowers profusely but the white or cream-coloured flowers occur singly within the foliage of the shrub and are sweetly scented. The stamens are in five bundles around the flower, each bundle containing 8 to 13 stamens. (In Melaleuca podiocarpa there are 30 to 45 stamens per bundle.)

Taxonomy and naming
Melaleuca cliffortioides was first formally described in 1905 by Ludwig Diels in Botanische jahrbucher fur systematik, pflanzengeschichte und pflanzengeographie under the heading Fragmenta Phytographiae Australiae occidentalis:Beitrage zur Kenntnis der Pflanzen Westaustraliens, ihrer Verbreitung und ihrer Lebensverhaltnisse ("Contributions to the knowledge of the plants of West Australia, where they are found and their conditions of existence"). The specific epithet (cliffortioides) refers to the apparent similarity of this species with a species of Cliffortia. The ending -oides is a Latin suffix meaning "resembling" or "having the form of".

Distribution and habitat
This melaleuca is found from the Ravensthorpe district to the Norseman district in the Coolgardie, Esperance Plains and Mallee biogeographic regions. It grows in sandy on rocky slopes and on undulating plains.

Conservation status
This species is classified as "not threatened" by the Government of Western Australia Department of Parks and Wildlife.

References

cliffortioides
Myrtales of Australia
Plants described in 1905
Endemic flora of Western Australia
Taxa named by Ludwig Diels